Events in the year 1867 in Brazil.

Incumbents
Monarch – Pedro II.
Prime Minister – Zacarias de Góis e Vasconcelos.

Events

 treaty of limits between Brazil and Bolivia was signed

Births

Deaths

References

 
1860s in Brazil
Years of the 19th century in Brazil
Brazil
Brazil